Ojrzanów  is a village in the administrative district of Gmina Ujazd, within Tomaszów Mazowiecki County, Łódź Voivodeship, in central Poland.

History
During the German occupation of Poland (World War II), the occupiers operated a forced labour camp for Poles and Jews at a local sawmill.

References

Villages in Tomaszów Mazowiecki County